Arja Hannus (born 13 January 1960) is a Swedish orienteering competitor, competing for sports club Selånger SK.  She won the 1987 Individual World Orienteering Championships.  She is three times Relay World Champion, from 1981, 1989 and 1991, as a member of the Swedish winning teams, and has a silver medal from 1987.

References

1960 births
Living people
People from Sundsvall
Swedish orienteers
Female orienteers
Foot orienteers
World Orienteering Championships medalists
Sportspeople from Västernorrland County
20th-century Swedish women